Debes is a lunar impact crater that is located to the north of the Mare Crisium, in the eastern part of the Moon's near side. It was named after German cartographer . It lies just to the northwest of the crater Tralles and the prominent Cleomedes.

This crater is joined to the oval-shaped Debes A through a break in the southern rim. The latter crater is joined along its western rim by Debes B, so that the result is a triple-crater formation. The surviving part of Debes is somewhat eroded and rounded, when compared to the sharper-rimmed Tralles, and the interior floor is relatively level and featureless.

Satellite craters
By convention these features are identified on lunar maps by placing the letter on the side of the crater midpoint that is closest to Debes.

References

 
 
 
 
 
 
 
 
 
 
 

Impact craters on the Moon